The weepul (also known as a weeple, wuppie, or ) is a small, spherical, fluffy toy, with large, plastic googly eyes, and no limbs.  come in various colors. Usually  possess antennae and also large paper feet, with an adhesive layer on the bottom, which is protected by a layer of plastic that is peeled off before deployment.

According to Rick Ebel, the weepul was created in 1971 by the Oklahoma City promotional firm, Bipo Inc. It was named by owner Tom Blundell after a stuffed doll his parents had taken to market several years earlier. Blundell figured the little-people stick-on would only be a flash in the pan, “but it just got a life to it, and it still isn’t ready to die.”

In the Netherlands the weepul was introduced  as a marketing tool in the 1980s by the name of wuppie. The wuppie was created by Tom Bodt and Eduard van Wensen, two promotion salesmen, who had been inspired by weeples which he discovered during a trip in the US in the 1970s. World Unique Promotional Product Identity & Emotion is a backronym for wuppie.<ref>De ontdekker van de wuppie in Amerika (The discoverer of the wuppie in America), news article Algemeen Dagblad, 20 June 2006</ref>

The  became extremely popular in the summer of 1981.  were often given out as a prize from 1–900 numbers in the 1980s.

 Netherlands comeback 
Twenty-five years later,  made a comeback in the Netherlands. In 2006, the Dutch supermarket chain Albert Heijn re-introduced  in a new campaign connected to the FIFA World Cup 2006 under the motto Wup Holland Wup, a variation of Hup Holland Hup (Go Holland Go), a Dutch football chant. - Article in the Algemeen Dagblad of June 1. 2006 Albert Heijn used  produced in orange, red, white and blue as a collectible trading stamp, functioning as part of a loyalty program. Three  and a fee of €2.49 Euro could be exchanged for a "mega wup". Albert Heijn's wuppie campaign with the World Cup Wuppie Song ("With a Wup, we will win the World Cup''") proved popular. Dutch media reported that cars which displayed such "mega wup" on their dashboards were sometimes broken into. A classroom of an elementary school in The Hague was burgled for its many  on display in the window sills.

See also
 Gonk

References

Promotion and marketing communications
Stuffed toys